Franz Dahlem (14 January 1892 – 17 December 1981) was a German politician. Dahlem was a leading official of the Communist Party of Germany (KPD) and, after 1945, of East Germany's ruling Socialist Unity Party (SED).

By the early 1950s he had become well known and popular with many comrades in the higher reaches of the SED (party) and was seen by some as a possible rival to the country's leader, Walter Ulbricht: he was stripped of his functions in 1953. He was formally rehabilitated in 1956, however.

He sat as a Communist member of the German Reichstag between 1928 and 1933. and, except for a few years following his fall from grace, as an SED member of the East German Volkskammer (People's Chamber) between 1947 and 1976. Of more significance in terms of the East German power structures, he was also a member of the ruling party's Central Committee from 1946 till 1953, and again from 1957 till his retirement in 1974.

Life

Provenance and early years
Franz Dahlem was born into a Roman Catholic family in Rohrbach-lès-Bitche, a small town in Alsace-Lorraine, then part of the German Empire (now in France), in the hills to the southeast of Saarbrücken. His father, Jacques Pierre Dahlem, was a railway worker. After attending middle school in Château-Salins he went on to senior school at Sarreguemines, where his school career was curtailed due to lack of money. He was also a member of the Catholic Youth League at Sarreguemines between 1908 and 1911. He undertook a traineeship as an export salesman in Saarbrücken and / or Cologne between 1911 and 1913. In 1913 he joined the SPD (Social Democratic Party / Sozialdemokratische Partei Deutschlands), remaining a member of it till 1917.

War
Despite his opposition to the war he served in the army between 1914 and 1918. However, when the SPD split in 1917, primarily over the issue of party support for continuing its support for the government line over the war, Dahlem chose the breakaway USPD (Independent Social Democratic Party of Germany / Unabhängige Sozialdemokratische Partei Deutschlands). It was also in 1917 that he was wounded while serving on the Eastern Front. After being transferred to Macedonia he developed malaria which led to several periods in hospital.

Revolution
During the post-war year of revolutions Dahlem joined the workers' and soldiers' council, initially in Allenstein (East Prussia) and subsequently in Cologne, participating in support of implementation of the slogan "All power to the councils" ("Alle Macht den Räten!"). He also co-founded and became the editor of "Sozialistische Republik", a USPD newspaper in which he powerfully advocated the party's membership of the Comintern and a party merger with the new Communist Party of Germany. He also served, between 1919 and 1923, as a Cologne city councillor.

In 1919 Franz Dahlem married Käthe Weber (1899-1974) who shared in his political beliefs and activism.

Politics in a democracy
In December 1920 Dahlem took part in the "unification party conference" at which the left wing of the USPD merged with the German Communist Party to form what was briefly known as the VKPD (Vereinigte Kommunistische Partei Deutschlands / Unified German Communist Party). Here, together with Philipp Fries and Henriette Ackermann, he was elected to the local party leadership of the Middle Rhine region. He also briefly represented Middle Rhine nationally on the party central committee. In 1921 he surrendered his editorship of the "Sozialistische Republik", but during 1921/22 he briefly edited the Berlin-based "Internationalen Presse-Korrespondenz". When the French army occupied the occupied the Ruhr region in January 1923 Dahlem helped to organise "resistance to French and German imperialism". He was sent by the German Communist leadership to Paris in order to coordinate with the French Communists against the common enemy. From 1923 Dahlem was working in the Organisation Department of the Party Central Committee. He was particularly effective in the application of "Leninist principles" to party organisation. In 1927 he himself joined the Central Committee, becoming a member of its Politburo just two years later.

Dahlem also participated in the legislative processes of the newly democratised state, sitting as a Communist member in the Prussian "Landtag" (regional legislative assembly) between 1921 and 1924 and as a Communist Member of the national Reichstag (parliament), representing the Potsdam electoral district, between 1928 and 1933.

Recurring fragmentation was a feature of left-wing politics in general and of the German Communist Party in particular during the 1920s. One reason Dahlem was sent to Berlin in 1921 to edit the "Internationalen Presse-Korrespondenz" was to enforce his separation from Central Committee members in his Rhineland home patch at a time when he was opposing the party leadership. Areas of contention included both the party's attitude to the competing factions of Soviet communism during the Russian Civil War and the practical issue of how fast to progress the party's revolutionary objectives following what was seen as the failure of the German Revolution of 1918–1919. After 1923, with Zinoviev sidelined in Moscow and Stalin's control becoming more absolute, there was no longer any question of the German Communists having to choose between competing versions of Soviet communism, and the German Communist Party became more focused domestically. During a further period of internal fragmentation at the end of the 1920s, Dahlem was closely aligned with the strategy of the party leader Ernst Thälmann, which was variously seen either as a determined policy to unite the working class behind the Communist Party in order to resist the rising tide of Nazism or else as an aggressive and sustained assault on the centre-left Social Democratic Party which created a bitter division on the political left through which the Nazis found their path to power.

It was at Thälmann's suggestion that in November 1930 Dahklem took over the leadership of the Revolutionary Trades Union Opposition (Revolutionäre Gewerkschafts Opposition). He retained this function till he was replaced by Fritz Schulte in June 1932.

Régime change and exile
The Nazis took power in January 1933 and lost little time in converting the German state into a one-party dictatorship. Party political activity (unless in support of the Nazi party) became illegal. The eleventh party conference, attended by the Communist Party leadership, took place on 7 February 1933 at the Sporthaus Ziegenhals, a restaurant in the countryside just outside Berlin on its southern side. Dahlem was one of approximately 40 party leaders who attended. The meeting later achieved iconic status as the last meeting of the German Communist Party until after 1945, and in 1953 the restaurant itself had been taken over and converted into a memorial centre. By that time many of those who had met in February 1933 had been killed or died in concentration camps.

Under instructions from the party leadership, Dahlem himself fled to Paris, together with Wilhelm Pieck und Wilhelm Florin, in May 1933. The French capital quickly became the de facto headquarters of the German Communist Party in exile, and Dahlem's own membership of the Party Central Committee was confirmed in 1935, following internal party ructions during the early 1930s. In 1939 he was back in the party politburo.

Franz Dahlem was back in Berlin, secretly and illegally, between February and July 1934, undertaking "political work". Much of his activity was involved in trying to build and strengthen an international "people's front" opposition to the rising tide of fascism in Germany. In July 1935 he travelled to Brussels where he took part in the 7th World Congress of the Comintern. In 1934 he had taken French citizenship, which he would retain till 1941. In 1936, after he had been undertaking "party work" in Prague for some months, he was stripped of his German citizenship. By 1937 the Spanish Civil War was becoming, for adherents of both sides, the fulcrum of the struggle between fascism and communism. Between 1936 and 1938 Dahlem was in charge of the Central Political Commission of the International Brigades in Spain. In 1938/39 he took over as leader of the Central Committee secretariat of the German Communist Party in its Paris exile, in succession to Walter Ulbricht whose by this time, when not in Spain, was spending most of his time not in Paris but in Moscow. Dahlem took the lead in preparing for and running the German Communist Party conference in Bern, which took place in February 1939, just over half a year before the launch of a more generalised war across Europe.

More war
The German army invaded Poland and the French government responded immediately by declaring war on Germany in September 1939. For most people in Paris it would be another eight months before the fighting fully impacted daily life, but refugees from race based and political persecution in Nazi Germany were affected sooner than most. In September 1939 Franz Dahlem was one of thousands who were arrested. He was placed in the concentration camp at Le Vernet in the southwest of the country. He immediately communicated to the French Prime Minister, Édouard Daladier, offering the services of the German Communists to the French army and calling for close cooperation against the Nazis, but the offer was countermanded by the party leadership in Moscow. Meanwhile, Käthe, who had accompanied her husband in Paris, relocated to Toulouse where, living illegally under the false name "Cathérine Dallerey", she acted as treasurer for the local branch of the German Communist branch in exile between 1940 and 1944. It is known that she had contacts with the French Communist Party in the area and that she was in touch with party comrades interned at Le Vernet. In 1941, while still at Le Vernet, Franz Dahlen took Soviet citizenship.

During the first part of 1941 a large group of German Communist veterans of the Spanish Civil War were liberated by members of the French Resistance from the camp at Le Vernet, where security was poor. Dahlem was not one of those freed in this break-out, however, and the Gestapo ordered the local government to hand him over immediately. In October 1941 he was one of approximately twenty German prisoners removed to a secret prison at Castres by the SS and handed over to the Gestapo. He was transferred to Berlin in August 1942, and spent the next eight months in the Gestapo headquarters bunker there. After this he was transferred to the concentration camp at Mauthausen. According to one source he survived his internment at Mauthausen only because of the solidarity shown to him by fellow veterans of the Civil War in Spain.

Because of his Comintern involvement and his participation in the Spanish Civil War Dahlen had a high profile internationally at this time. In Great Britain, early in 1942, a petition was signed by 350 people including 98 members of the House of Commons and 40 members of the House of Lords, calling for the release of Franz Dahlen, Luigi Longo and other opponents of the Nazi regime imprisoned at Castres.

Soviet occupation zone
The Red army liberated Dahlem from Mauthausen on 7 May 1945, and he was taken to Moscow. Here he awaited the call from the German Communist Party which came through on 11 June. He arrived back in Germany on 1 July 1945 with Wilhelm Pieck, returning to the region surrounding Berlin which, until October 1949, was administered as the Soviet occupation zone. Between 1945 and 1953 he played a key role in creating the German Democratic Republic (East Germany), a separated Soviet sponsored German state with its political, economic and social institutions modeled on those of the Soviet Union itself. The soviet-styled one-party government was achieved through the creation of the Socialist Unity Party (Sozialistische Einheitspartei Deutschlands / SED) which was formally launched in April 1946 as the product of a contentious merger, within the Soviet zone, of the two leftwing-labour parties, the Communist Party and the centre-left Social Democratic Party. By the time the new state was launched, formally in October 1949, the former Social Democrats had been removed from positions of influence and the SED (party) had become a Soviet inspired communist party by another name. Unlike the Nazi regime which had ended in 1945, the new state would achieve one-party government not by banning alternative political parties but by controlling them, using a Bloc Party structure, the notorious "single-list" voting system, and predetermined fixed quotas of seats in the legislature occupied by approved representatives of their parties. Dahlem played at leading role in the creation of the new party, and the establishment of the Bloc Party structure Between 1946 and 1953 he served as a member of the SED party executive and its powerful Central Committee. He was also leader of the new party's "West Commission": it is believed in some quarters that the Soviets had originally intended to impose the political structure created in the Soviet occupation zone across the three western occupation zones. This never happened, but his leadership of the West Commission made Dahlem the de facto leader of the Communist Party in what would become, in May 1949, the German Federal Republic (West Germany). His work gave him an extensive network of contacts within the party, and his widespread popularity led to talk of a rivalry with Walter Ulbricht, the Party Central Committee General Secretary (after 1953 "First Secretary").

German Democratic Republic
Stalin died in March 1953, which was followed by a power struggle in Moscow which resonated powerfully in East Berlin. In both capitals there was talk of a lessening of the "hardline Stalinism" of recent years, while harsh treatment of the civil population and the perception of a growing disparity between austerity levels in East and West Germany led to the East German uprising of June 1953. The uprising was suppressed with the help of Soviet troops, and was followed by a period of heightened nervousness within the party leadership which in turn proved the trigger for a purge from the party leadership of senior party officers seen as possible threats to the power base of Walter Ulbricht.

Back in 1950 Dahlem had already attracted the attention of the "Central Party Control Commission" ("Zentrale Parteikontrollkommission" / ZPKK) in the context of the Paul Merker affair. (Paul Merker was another popular figure in the upper echelons of the party who had posed a threat to Ulbricht's power base.) The ZPKK had shown a particular interest Dahlem's contacts with the (by now increasingly mistrusted) Soviet spy, Noel Field, whom Dahlem had helped to obtain a Czechoslovak residency permit back in 1949. Barely two months after Stalin's death, in December 1952 Dahlem received a powerful rebuke from the party for "kaderpolitischer Fehler" (loosely: cadre political errors). A renewal of party interest in Noel Field may have been triggered by the Slánský show trial in Prague at the end of 1952. Half a year later, on 15 May 1953, the Party Central Committee stripped Dahlem of all his functions, citing "political blindness in respect of the activities of imperialist agents" (which seems to have been another reference to Noel Field). There was fevered talk of a Zionist conspiracy and Ulbricht pressed Moscow to give the go ahead to set up a show trial for Franz Dahlem along with one for Paul Merker. Dahlem refused to co-operate in a process of self-criticism, and accordingly the ZPKK dug back into his past in some detail. Hermann Matern, the head of the commission, was critical above all of the attitude Dahlem had displayed in Paris back in 1939, which seems to be a reference to his offer to the French government of military support on behalf of the German communists in French exile. His wife spoke up in his defence, in June 1953 accusing Hermann Matern of lying. In the end Dahlem was spared a show trial, which one source attributes to the lessening of political savagery sometimes characterised as the Khrushchev Thaw, though Ulbricht nevertheless had his way in respect of Paul Merker whose show trial took place on 29/30 March 1955 and ended with the pronouncement of an eight-year prison sentence.

In the end Merker was released and rehabilitated in 1957. Dahlem's return to grace began in 1955, though he was never again powerful enough to be seen as a threat to Walter Ulbricht. In 1955 he was given a junior post in the department for higher education, and a couple of years later he was promoted to the rank of a junior minister in the department. His formal rehabilitation took place in July 1956. January 1957 saw him co-opted back into the Party Central Committee. In 1957 he also became a member of the influential National Research Council.

Under the Soviet-insipred constitution, power in East Germany resided unambiguously with the ruling party: the power of the Nation's Parliament (Volksammer) was correspondingly subordinated. The stark inferiority of the parliament was in some respects obscured because senior members of the Party Central Committee also sat as members of the Volkskammer. Franz Dahlem was a member of the Volkskammer (and of the People's Congress which was its precursor) from its inauguration in 1947 till his exclusion in 1953. He formally handed in his mandate on 3 February 1954. He returned to the Volkskammer in 1963, remaining a member of it until 1976.

Awards and honours (not necessarily the full list)

 1956 Hans Beimler Medal
 1962 Artur Becker medal
 1962 Order of Karl Marx
 1964 Patriotic Order of Merit in gold
 1965 Merit medal of the National People's Army
 1967 Patriotic Order of Merit gold clasp
 1970 Star of People's Friendship
 1970 Honorary citizenship of Ivry-sur-Seine (jointly with his wife)
 1972 Merit medal of the National People's Army
 1977 Grand Star of People's Friendship

Notes

References

1892 births
1981 deaths
People from Moselle (department)
People from Alsace-Lorraine
Social Democratic Party of Germany politicians
Independent Social Democratic Party politicians
Communist Party of Germany politicians
Members of the Politburo of the Central Committee of the Socialist Unity Party of Germany
Members of the Reichstag of the Weimar Republic
Members of the Provisional Volkskammer
Members of the 1st Volkskammer
Members of the 4th Volkskammer
Members of the 5th Volkskammer
Members of the 6th Volkskammer
Members of the Landtag of Mecklenburg-Western Pomerania
Executive Committee of the Communist International
German Army personnel of World War I
German people of the Spanish Civil War
International Brigades personnel
Communists in the German Resistance
Mauthausen concentration camp survivors
Recipients of the Patriotic Order of Merit (honor clasp)